Yash (यश्) is a Sanskrit word which means success, splendor, majesty, luxury, rich, eminence, and fame. It is usually used as a name.
This name is mostly used in India.

People with the name include:

 Yash (actor), born Naveen Kumar Gowda, Indian actor, known for KGF film series
 Yash A Patnaik, Indian producer
 Yash Birla, chairman of the Indian conglomerate Yash Birla Group
 Yash Chopra, Hindi film director, producer, founder of Yash Raj Films
 Yash Dasgupta, Indian Hindi & Bengali film actor
 Yash Gera, Indian actor
 Yash Ghai, Kenyan academic in constitutional law
 Yash Gupta, Indian cricketer
 Yash Johar, Hindi film producer
 Yash Kumar, Nepali musical artist
 Yash Kumarr, Bhojpuri actor
 Yash Mistry, Indian child actor
 Yash Pal, Indian scientist and educator
 Yash Pandit, Indian actor
 Yash Sinha, Indian actor
 Yash Soni, Indian actor
 Yash Tandon, Ugandan policymaker and political activist
 Yash Tonk, Indian actor

See also
Yash (disambiguation)

Indian masculine given names
Hindu given names